Gheorghe Tohăneanu (born 1 June 1936) is a Romanian gymnast. He competed in eight events at the 1964 Summer Olympics.

References

External links
 

1936 births
Living people
Romanian male artistic gymnasts
Olympic gymnasts of Romania
Gymnasts at the 1964 Summer Olympics
People from Covasna County